Francis Joseph Callahan (born June 4, 1993) is a former American football quarterback. He played college football at Wesley, a Division III program in Dover, Delaware. He was signed by the Green Bay Packers as an undrafted free agent in 2016, and was briefly a member of the New Orleans Saints, Cleveland Browns, Philadelphia Eagles, Tampa Bay Buccaneers, Baltimore Ravens, Detroit Lions, and Seattle Dragons.

College career
After graduation from Holy Spirit High School in his hometown of Absecon, New Jersey, Callahan appeared in four games for Wesley as a true freshman in 2011. He completed three of nine throws for 26 yards, but missed the entire next season with an injury and redshirted.

In 2013, Callahan started all thirteen games for the Wolverines and completed 269 of 461 attempts for 3,599 yards and 29 touchdowns. He set Wesley single-season records in completions and attempts and ranked second in single-season passing yards. In his first career start against Widener, he threw for 510 yards and five touchdowns. In the following week, Callahan led the Wolverines to victory with a 43-yard Hail Mary touchdown on fourth and 21 with under a minute remaining to beat archrival Salisbury. Callahan also helped the Wolverines beat the Division I Charlotte 49ers 35–28. In that game, he passed for 317 yards, threw two touchdowns, and ran for another two. In the Division III playoffs, Wesley beat Johns Hopkins 29–24 in the first round; Callahan threw a 33-yard touchdown pass with 0:13 remaining and finished with 244 passing yards and four touchdowns. Wesley faced Mount Union in the NCAA quarterfinals. Behind 31–0 after the first quarter, the Wolverines fell short by just three, 62–59; Mount Union recovered an unsuccessful onside kick with ninety seconds remaining. Callahan set school and NCAA playoff records with 633 passing yards and eight passing touchdowns.

As a redshirt junior in 2014, Callahan threw for 4,190 yards and 46 touchdowns with 10 interceptions, making it the best season ever for a Wesley quarterback. In the fourth game, Wesley beat Southern Virginia 47–7, with Callahan passing for 339 yards and five touchdowns. He went on to have 300 yards or more in the first five games of the season. Callahan once again faced D-I Charlotte in the regular season, this time in the season finale. He threw for a total of 336 yards and two touchdowns with pair of rushing touchdowns in the Wolverines' 38–33 loss. Callahan and the Wolverines dominated in their first three playoff games, outscoring opponents 152–20 until losing again to Mount Union, this time by a wider margin, 70–21.

Returning for a fifth year in 2015, Callahan threw for 5,063 yards and 55 touchdowns and led Wesley back to the D-III playoffs. He was awarded the Gagliardi Trophy, considered the Heisman Trophy for Division III, and became the first D-III player to throw for over 5,000 yards in a season.

Statistics

Professional career

Green Bay Packers
Not selected in the 2016 NFL Draft, Callahan signed as a free agent with the Green Bay Packers on May 6. He threw for 499 yards, three touchdowns, and zero interceptions in the preseason, earning him a spot on the Packers' 53-man roster. He was released by the Packers on October 13.

New Orleans Saints
On October 14, Callahan was claimed off waivers by the New Orleans Saints, and waived by the team on October 22.

Cleveland Browns
Callahan was claimed off waivers by the Cleveland Browns on October 24, and released by the team on November 28.

Green Bay Packers (second stint)
On December 2, Callahan was signed to the Packers' practice squad, and was promoted to the active roster on December 17, 2016.

On September 2, 2017, Callahan was waived by the Packers and was signed to the practice squad the next day. After starter Aaron Rodgers suffered a broken collarbone in Week 6 against the Minnesota Vikings, head coach Mike McCarthy stated that Brett Hundley would take over as starter and Callahan would be Hundley's backup. Callahan was promoted to the active roster the following day. On December 16, 2017, with Hundley still maintaining his position as the Packers' second-string quarterback and the return of Aaron Rodgers from injured reserve, Callahan was cut to make room for Rodgers. However, three days later on December 19, the Packers re-signed Callahan after Rodgers was placed back on injured reserve. Callahan made his NFL debut on December 31, completing 5 of 7 passes for 11 yards.

On April 30, 2018, Callahan was waived by the Packers.

Philadelphia Eagles
On May 7, 2018, Callahan signed a two-year contract with the Philadelphia Eagles. He was waived on September 1, 2018.

Tampa Bay Buccaneers
On January 3, 2019, Callahan signed a reserve/future contract with the Tampa Bay Buccaneers. On April 26, 2019, the Buccaneers waived Callahan.

Baltimore Ravens
On July 29, 2019, Callahan was signed by the Baltimore Ravens. He was waived during final roster cuts on August 30, 2019.

Detroit Lions
On November 30, 2019, Callahan was signed to the Detroit Lions. His practice squad contract with the team expired on January 6, 2020.

Seattle Dragons
Callahan was selected by the Seattle Dragons during the 2020 XFL Draft's open phase. He signed a contract with the team on January 13, 2020. He was waived during final roster cuts on January 22, 2020.

Team 9
Callahan was signed to the XFL's practice squad team, referred to as Team 9, on January 30, 2020. He had his contract terminated when the league suspended operations on April 10, 2020.

NFL career statistics

References

External links
Wesley Wolverines bio
Green Bay Packers bio

1993 births
Living people
American football quarterbacks
Baltimore Ravens players
Cleveland Browns players
Detroit Lions players
Green Bay Packers players
New Orleans Saints players
People from Absecon, New Jersey
Philadelphia Eagles players
Players of American football from New Jersey
Seattle Dragons players
Sportspeople from Atlantic County, New Jersey
Tampa Bay Buccaneers players
Team 9 players
Holy Spirit High School (New Jersey) alumni
Wesley Wolverines football players